Axiologina is a genus of picture-winged flies in the family Ulidiidae.

Species
 A. ferrumeguinum
 A. ferumequinum

References

Ulidiidae